Paenula is a monotypic genus of Ecuadorian huntsman spiders containing the single species, Paenula paupercula. It was first described by Eugène Louis Simon in 1897, and is found in Ecuador.

See also
 List of Sparassidae species

References

Sparassidae
Spiders of South America